Hermann Hermannsson  (7 October 1914 - 28 August 1975) was an Icelandic former footballer. He was part of the Iceland national football team between 1946 and 1949. He played 4 matches.

See also
 List of Iceland international footballers

References

External links
 

1914 births
1975 deaths
Icelandic footballers
Iceland international footballers
Icelandic male footballers
Association footballers not categorized by position
Valur (men's football) managers
Icelandic football managers